Multibrands International is a multinational fast-moving consumer goods company headquartered in Bradford, West Yorkshire.Founded in 1998, it manufactures home-care and personal-care products, beverages, and high-performance LED bulbs.

Manufacturing companies of England
Personal care companies
Energy drinks
Manufacturing companies established in 1998